Internal conflict in South Sudan may refer to:

Ethnic violence in South Sudan (2011–present)
South Sudanese Civil War